Max Yashirin (born September 30, 1982) is an Iraq War Veteran who ran for U.S. Congress in Nebraska's 1st congressional district. He was one of two Iraq War veterans running for office in Nebraska in 2008, and ran unopposed in the primaries. Yashirin was defeated in the general election by Republican incumbent Jeff Fortenberry.

Biography
A Russian émigré, Yashirin came to the United States when he was 8 years old. After graduating from Lincoln Northeast High School he joined the Marine Corps Reserve. After completing training, Yashirin enrolled at the University of Nebraska-Lincoln, majoring in international business with minors in Russian and economics. In the years after enrolling in college Yashirin was found guilty of driving with a suspended driver's license and for driving under the influence of alcohol.

While he was a student at UNL in 2004 his unit was activated and he was sent to Iraq. Yashirin earned the rank of sergeant and served a seven-month tour of duty at Al Asad Airbase, the largest U.S. military airbase in the largely Sunni western Iraq Province of Al Anbar Province. He was a heavy equipment mechanic.

After serving one year Yashirin returned to Nebraska and to the university, where he plans to finish his degree in international business in spring 2008.

As of fall 2008 Max’s brother Nick was deployed in Iraq.

Campaign
This is Max Yashirin's first campaign for public office. Regarding his positions Yashirin has stated, "I am an ardent fiscal conservative." He has said his political priorities include balancing the federal budget, reducing the national debt, focusing on economic growth, providing health care for children, developing a healthy and well-educated work force, and investing in the future.

In February 2008, early in Yashirin's campaign, it was revealed that the Nebraska Republican Party had snapped up the www.maxyashirin.com domain name and posted pictures of him drinking and smoking taken from the social networking website Facebook. "We’re using it to highlight the differences between our two-term congressman and a 25-year-old who hasn’t finished college. Our goal is not to be malicious or mean," said Matt Miltenberger, executive director of the state Republican Party. Yashirin responded, "I can’t believe that they would stoop that low. Obviously, they must be taking me seriously. This is what people do when they really feel threatened."

After Yashirin revealed he had raised about $4,100 for his campaign, former U.S. Senator/Medal of Honor recipient Bob Kerrey announced he would serve as chairman for Yashirin's campaign finance committee.

Yashirin was one of two Democratic anti-Iraq War Veteran candidates running for Congress in Nebraska in 2008, the other being Richard Carter, who is also running against a Republican incumbent who supports the Iraq War. Yashirin was defeated in the general election by Jeff Fortenberry, who won more than twice the number of votes as Yashirin statewide.

See also

References

External links
 Max Yashirin for Congress, official campaign site
 "Iraq veteran sets sights on Congress", Daily Nebraskan - University of Nebraska-Lincoln student newspaper.

1982 births
Living people
Politicians from Lincoln, Nebraska
Nebraska Democrats
United States Marine Corps personnel of the Iraq War
Soviet emigrants to the United States
United States Marine Corps reservists
Lincoln Northeast High School alumni